Eric Vail (born September 16, 1953) is a Canadian former ice hockey player who played nine seasons in the National Hockey League (NHL) for the Atlanta Flames, Calgary Flames and Detroit Red Wings. He helped Calgary reach the 1981 NHL playoff semifinals for the first time in club history.

He won the Calder Memorial Trophy in 1975 as the NHL's rookie of the year and played in the 1977 NHL All-Star Game. Also in 1977, Vail played with Team Canada at the World Ice Hockey Championship. At the time of his 1981 trade to Detroit, Vail was the Flames' franchise leader in goal scoring.

Playing career
Vail played three years of junior hockey in the Ontario Hockey Association (OHA).  He spent two seasons with the Niagara Falls Flyers, scoring 48 points in 59 games in 1970–71 and improving to 73 points in 60 games in 1971–72.  He split the 1972–73 OHA season between the Sault Ste. Marie Greyhounds and the Sudbury Wolves, scoring 48 goals and 105 points combined between the two teams. Vail was selected by both the Atlanta Flames, 21st overall at the 1973 NHL Amateur Draft and the Quebec Nordiques, 29th overall at the 1973 WHA Amateur Draft.

Choosing to play with the Flames, Vail made his NHL debut in 1973–74, appearing in 23 games.  He scored two goals and nine assists, but spent the majority of the season in the Central Hockey League (CHL) with the Omaha Knights. Since he played fewer than 25 NHL games in his first season, Vail was still considered a rookie in 1974–75.  He led all rookies with 39 goals and had 60 points on the campaign.  Vail won the Calder Memorial Trophy as the NHL's rookie of the year, the first player in Flames history to do so.

Injuries reduced Vail's offensive output in 1975–76 as he scored only 16 goals.  Vail rebounded to score 32 goals and 71 points in 1976–77. He played in the 1977 NHL All-Star Game, the only such appearance of his career. He also made his only appearance with the 
national team, scoring four goals in nine games for the fourth place Canadians at the World Ice Hockey Championship.

Vail scored 22, 35 and 28 goals in his following three seasons and set a career high with 83 points in 1978–79. In 1979–80, Vail passed Tom Lysiak as the Flames' all-time leading goal scorer. His 174 career goals was the most in the Flames' tenure in Atlanta, and he was second to Lysiak with 383 points. Vail transferred with the franchise when it relocated to Canada, becoming the Calgary Flames in 1980–81. He had 28 goals and 64 points in 64 games in his first season in Calgary.

Though he averaged nearly 30 goals per season, the Flames often felt Vail was playing below his capability.  He was considered to have one of the best shots in the league, but was often accused of coasting on the ice and carried a reputation for "living large" off the ice. He clashed with head coach Al MacNeil, forcing the team to make a move early in the 1981–82 season. Stating that "Eric Vail and the Calgary Flames were no longer compatible", General Manager Cliff Fletcher sent the team's all-time leading scorer to the Detroit Red Wings in exchange for Gary McAdam and a draft pick on November 10, 1981. Vail scored 10 goals in 52 games with Detroit.

The Red Wings were similarly frustrated with Vail.  They demoted him to the Adirondack Red Wings, their American Hockey League (AHL) affiliate, for ten games in 1981–82, then left him there for the entire 1982–83 AHL season. Vail scored 20 goals and 49 points for Adirondack then retired following the season.

Personal life
Vail and his ex-wife Sylvia have two children: Scott and Natasha. He returned to Atlanta following his career, ultimately settling in Lawrenceville, Georgia, where he managed a nightclub.  When the NHL returned to Atlanta in 1999, Vail joined the Thrashers organization in a community relations capacity and served as an in-arena analyst for the team's radio broadcasts. Vail's son Scott is the caddy for PGA Tour golfer Brandt Snedeker.

Career statistics

Regular season and playoffs

International

References
Career statistics:

External links
 

1953 births
Living people
Adirondack Red Wings players
Atlanta Flames draft picks
Atlanta Flames players
Calder Trophy winners
Calgary Flames players
Canadian ice hockey forwards
Detroit Red Wings players
Sportspeople from Timmins
National Hockey League All-Stars
Niagara Falls Flyers players
Oklahoma City Stars players
Omaha Knights (CHL) players
Quebec Nordiques (WHA) draft picks
Sault Ste. Marie Greyhounds players
Sudbury Wolves players
Ice hockey people from Ontario